Claude Thorburn (born 23 February 1987) is a Namibian cricket umpire. He has stood as an umpire in domestic first-class and List A matches in Namibia and South Africa. He stood in his first One Day International (ODI) match, between Papua New Guinea and the United States, in the third-place playoff in the 2019 ICC World Cricket League Division Two tournament in Namibia. He stood in his first Twenty20 International (T20I) match, between Namibia and Botswana, on 20 August 2019.

See also
 List of One Day International cricket umpires
 List of Twenty20 International cricket umpires

References

External links
 

1987 births
Living people
Namibian One Day International cricket umpires
Namibian Twenty20 International cricket umpires
Place of birth missing (living people)